Sangcheon Station is a railway station on the Gyeongchun Line in Gapyeong, Gyeonggi Province, South Korea. Its station subname is Homyeong Lake, where Homyeong Lake is located nearby.

External links
 Station information from Korail

Seoul Metropolitan Subway stations
Metro stations in Gapyeong County
Railway stations opened in 1939